Playa Kalki is a beach on the Caribbean island of Curaçao, also known as Alice in Wonderland due to mushroom-shaped coral formations. The name Kalki is unrelated to the Avatar Kalki, but comes from the local Papiamentu word for the white coral rock and limestone, which is abundant on the beach and surrounding cliffs.

Playa Kalki and its surroundings are known for their good scuba diving conditions. Several reefs on and around Playa Kalki offer good dive sites for beginners and professionals. There is a professional dive center located directly on the beach at Playa Kalki.

References

External links
Playa Kalki Shorediving.com
 

Beaches of Curaçao